Carlo Diotallevi (1607 – March 1652) was a Roman Catholic prelate who served as Bishop of Strongoli (1639–1652).

Biography
Carlo Diotallevi was born in Rimini, Italy.
On 2 May 1639, he was appointed during the papacy of Pope Urban VIII as Bishop of Strongoli.
On 22 May 1639, he was consecrated bishop by Alessandro Cesarini (iuniore), Cardinal-Deacon of Sant'Eustachio, with Lelio Falconieri, Titular Archbishop of Thebae, and Giovanni Battista Altieri, Bishop Emeritus of Camerino, serving as co-consecrators. 
He served as Bishop of Strongoli until his death in March 1652.

References

External links and additional sources
 (for Chronology of Bishops) 
 (for Chronology of Bishops) 

17th-century Italian Roman Catholic bishops
Bishops appointed by Pope Urban VIII
1607 births
1652 deaths